Jaysin Strife (born Nathan Blodgett; August 14, 1985 – December 29, 2022) was an American professional wrestler who worked under the ring name of Jaysin Strife. Promotions Strife has competed in include National Wrestling Alliance (NWA), Pro Wrestling Phoenix (PWP), Magnum Pro Wrestling (MPW), 3XWrestling, and the International Wrestling Association (IWA).

Professional wrestling career 
Blodgett made his professional wrestling debut in 2005. He made an appearance on WWE Raw in 2014, and competed against Akira Tozawa on 205 Live. As an independent performer, he also wrestled for AEW Dark, Impact Wrestling, and other promotions.

Blodgett died on December 29, 2022 after an extended illness. His body was donated to medical research.

References

External links

1985 births
2022 deaths
American male professional wrestlers
Professional wrestlers from Iowa